The French Rugby League Championship is the major rugby league tournament for French professional and semi-professional clubs.

French Championships or French Championship may also refer to:

French national championships 
 Division 1 Féminine, women's football
 Elite One Championship, rugby league
 French Chess Championship
 French Gymnastics Championships
 French Rhythmic Gymnastics Championships
 French Figure Skating Championships
 Ligue 1, association football
 Ligue Magnus, ice hockey
 Rink Hockey French Championship, hockey on roller skates

Tennis competitions 
 French Community Championships, clay court tennis
 French Open, one of four major tennis tournaments
 French Pro Championship tennis, 1930–1968

Racing competitions 
 FFSA GT Championship (Grand Touring sports car racing
 French F4 Championship open-wheel auto racing
 French Rally Championship, rally auto racing
 French Supertouring Championship, a touring auto racing championship

See also
 French Open (disambiguation)